Cham cham, Chomchom or chum chum is a traditional Bengali sweet, popular throughout the Indian subcontinent. The sweet comes in a variety of colors, mainly light pink, light yellow, and white. It is coated with coconut or mawa flakes as a garnish.

History 

Chomchom Originated from Tangail District. Chamcham, an oval-shaped brownish variety of chomchom from Porabari in Tangail District of modern-day Bangladesh, dates back to mid-19th century. The unique taste has been attributed to the water in Porabari.

Jagadish Mishtanno Bhandar in Khustia District makes a version known as Maowar Chomchom. 

Chomchom is a popular item in Pohela Boishak, the Bengali new year, and Durga Puja.

See also
 Rasgulla
 Sandesh

References

External links
Cham cham

Bengali cuisine
Bangladeshi desserts
Indian desserts